Prelude 1983–1985 is a compilation album by In the Nursery, released in 1989 through Normal Records. It collects tracks from several of their early releases, including two singles and When Cherished Dreams Come True.

Track listing

Personnel 
In the Nursery
Ant Bennett – instruments
Janet Clarkson – narration
Klive Humberstone – instruments
Nigel Humberstone – instruments
Wilson – narration

References

External links 
 

1989 compilation albums
In the Nursery albums